Fall in Lovelyz is the third EP by South Korean girl group Lovelyz. It was released  on November 14, 2017 by Woollim Entertainment and distributed by CJ E&M Music. The album contains seven tracks, including the lead single, "Twinkle".

Background and release
In October 2017, Woollim Entertainment announced that Lovelyz would have a comeback. On October 25, Woollim Entertainment released the prologue film of Fall in Lovelyz along with the album's release date. On October 30, Woollim Entertainment released the first concept photos & video teasers of members Kei and Seo Jisoo. The remaining member teasers were released following the first teaser.

On November 4, Lovelyz released short version teaser for their title track "Twinkle", with the full version released on November 10.

On November 14, Woollim Entertainment released the music video for "Twinkle".

Promotion
On November 14, 2017, Lovelyz held their comeback showcase. The promotion for "Twinkle" started on November 17 on KBS' Music Bank. They received their music show first place for "Twinkle" at SBS MTV's The Show.

Track listing

Charts

Weekly charts

Year-end chart

Release history

References

2017 EPs
Lovelyz albums
Woollim Entertainment EPs
Stone Music Entertainment albums
Korean-language EPs